Georgia Flood (born 29 November 1992) is an Australian film, television and theatre actress. After studying at the L'École Internationale de Théâtre Jacques Lecoq in Paris and the 16th Street Actors Studio in Melbourne, Flood made her stage debut in a production of Blackbird. She made a guest appearance in City Homicide in 2008, before she was cast as Charlotte Barker in Tangle. Flood went on to join the casts of House Husbands and Wentworth. In 2013, she was a runner-up for the Heath Ledger Scholarship Award. The following year, Flood starred in ANZAC Girls as Alice Ross-King. The role led to a nomination for Best Actress in a Miniseries at the Golden Nymph Awards.

Early life
Flood was born on Phillip Island. The soprano Alexandra Flood is her sister, the author Morris West her grand-uncle. For six years she attended a school in Dubai. After moving to Melbourne when she was 12 years old, she began attending Methodist Ladies' College where she graduated in 2010. Flood knew that she wanted to act from an early age. After signing with a talent agency, she appeared in various advertisements. She then studied at the L'École Internationale de Théâtre Jacques Lecoq in Paris and at the 16th Street Actors Studio in Melbourne.

Career
Flood made her stage debut in a production of Blackbird at the Melbourne Theatre Company. She starred in a short film called Hugo, before she was cast in a guest role in police procedural City Homicide. Flood appeared in the Showcase drama Tangle as Charlotte Barker from 2009 until the show's third and final season. In 2011, Flood appeared as Belle in David Williamson's Don Parties On, a sequel to his 1971 play Don's Party.

The following year, Flood joined the cast of House Husbands in the recurring role of Phoebe Crabb. Flood and co-star Anna McGahan did not return for the fourth season. During 2013, Flood successfully auditioned for the role of Debbie Smith in Wentworth, a reimagining of the Prisoner. While reviewing the series, Brad Newsome of The Sydney Morning Herald commented, "Flood is always a delight to watch." In the same year, Flood was named as a runner-up for the Heath Ledger Scholarship Award, presented by Australians in Film.

2014 saw Flood star as Alice Ross-King in the miniseries ANZAC Girls. At her audition, she was told that she was too young for the part, but she fought for the role. Flood used a copy of Ross-King's diary to help her with the part. She explained, "I carried that diary with me everywhere, and if I was having some trouble in a scene, I'd go back to the diary and there would be a direct paragraph to answer my question." For her portrayal of Ross-King, Flood was nominated for the Golden Nymph Award for Best Actress in a Miniseries.

In 2015, Flood starred in Christine Roger's first feature film I Am Evangeline as lead character Evangeline, a clone who wants to find a cure for her sleeping sickness. Flood also joined the guest cast of Home and Away, and she made an appearance in the comedy series Here Come the Habibs.

In 2018, Flood was cast as the lead of Lifetime's American Princess. The series was cancelled after one season. Flood stars alongside Ezekiel Simat in the 2021 romantic comedy film Sit. Stay. Love.. Filmed on the Gold Coast in 2020, Flood plays aid-worker Annie, who attempts to reopen the local animal shelter with the help of her former high school enemy. Sit. Stay. Love. received theatrical release in Australia before got shown in television channels around the world, including Lifetime in the United States (under the new title The Dog Days of Christmas).

Filmography

References

External links

Living people
Australian television actresses
Australian film actresses
21st-century Australian actresses
Actresses from Victoria (Australia)
People educated at Methodist Ladies' College, Melbourne
1992 births